Le François 2nd Canton Sud is a former canton in the Arrondissement of Le Marin on Martinique. It had 8,401 inhabitants (2012). It was disbanded in 2015. The canton comprised part of the commune of Le François.

References

Cantons of Martinique